Horace Austin (October 15, 1831November 2, 1905) was an American politician. He served as the sixth Governor of Minnesota from January 9, 1870 to January 7, 1874. He was a Republican.

A reputation for clearheaded objectivity and disdain for contentious party politics enhanced the appeal of Judge Horace Austin as a gubernatorial candidate in 1869. Minnesota's sixth governor was determined to bring legislative power to bear against the railroad barons. His advocacy of strictly regulated passenger and freight rates and his opposition to the wholesale allocation of state lands to railroad development earned him a second term. But he was unable to resolve completely the problems inherent in controlling a booming transportation industry and curbing the excesses of its owners.

Born in 1831 in Canterbury, Connecticut, the son of a prosperous Connecticut farmer and graduate of a private academy, Austin taught school briefly before studying law. He was 25 when he moved to Minnesota and began practicing law in St. Peter. Six years later he joined the local Frontier Guards at the outbreak of the Dakota War of 1862. In 1869, while judge of the Sixth Judicial District, Austin impressed state Republican leaders with his fair-mindedness and won the gubernatorial nomination.

Remaining in the public sphere after leaving the governor's office, Austin served as third auditor of the U.S. Treasury in Washington, as register of the U.S. Land Office in Fargo, North Dakota, and finally as a railroad commissioner. He devoted his last 16 years to travel and relaxation at his Lake Minnetonka home. He died in 1905 in Minneapolis, Minnesota.

References
Biographical information and his  gubernatorial records are available for research use at the Minnesota Historical Society.

  	

1831 births
1905 deaths
People from Canterbury, Connecticut
Republican Party governors of Minnesota
People from Mendota, Minnesota
North Dakota Republicans